Rhythm of Life is the debut studio album by Scottish musician Paul Haig, released in November 1983 by Island Records. It was recorded at Sigma Sound Studios in New York City and RAK Studios in London with renowned record producer Alex Sadkin, known for his work on multiple albums by Grace Jones, and Thompson Twins. The album features guest musicians such as Bernie Worrell of Parliament-Funkadelic, Anton Fier of the Feelies and the Golden Palominos, and Tom Bailey of Thompson Twins. Four singles were released from Rhythm of Life: "Heaven Sent", "Never Give Up (Party Party)", "Justice" and "Blue for You". The track "Adoration" was originally performed while Haig was still a member of post-punk band Josef K. The album spent 2 weeks on the UK Albums Chart, peaking at No. 82.

In 2004, LTM remastered and re-issued the album on CD for the first time with five bonus tracks taken from the 1984 mini album Rhythm of Life Remixes. These are extended dance remixes by New York disc jockey (DJ) Bruce Forest. The same track listing was issued again in 2014 on Les Disques du Crépuscule.

Critical reception

In a retrospective review for AllMusic, critic Ned Raggett described the album as "something of a strained effort, finding Haig coming to grips with his dancefloor aspirations but not quite hitting the bull's-eye." Adding that "he often sounds like a guest on his own record -- the exception, besides his singing, being his recognizable guitar parts, though often they are buried in the arrangements. His voice frankly sounds unpleasant as well."

Track listing

Personnel
Credits are adapted from the Rhythm of Life liner notes.

Musicians
 Paul Haig – lead and backing vocals; guitars; drum machine programming
 Jack Waldman – keyboards; drum machine programming
 Bernie Worrell – keyboards
 Tom Bailey – keyboards; percussion
 Anton Fier – percussion
 Mike Nocito – percussion
 JS Subera – percussion
 Tina Baker – backing vocals
 Nikki Lauren – backing vocals
 Karen Brown – backing vocals

Production and artwork
 Alex Sadkin – producer
 Paul Haig – producer; sleeve concept
 Phil Thornalley – engineer
 John Potoker – engineer
 John Dent – mastering engineer
 Sheila Rock – photography

Charts

References

External links
 

Paul Haig albums
1983 debut albums
Albums produced by Alex Sadkin
Island Records albums